Alupa Clarke (born April 4, 1986) is a Canadian politician. Clarke was elected to represent the riding of Beauport—Limoilou in the House of Commons of Canada in the 2015 Canadian federal election. He served on the Opposition bench as Shadow Minister for Official Languages and la Francophonie. Clarke was defeated in the 2019 Canadian federal election.

Biography 
Alupa A. Clarke was born in Quebec City on April 4, 1986. He is the second child of a mother from Beauport, Quebec, and a father from Vancouver.

Clarke grew up in New Brunswick before spending several years overseas. After graduating from high school, he returned to Canada.

Clarke completed a master's degree in political science at Laval University, writing a thesis on constitutional theories of the judicialization of politics. At the same time, he followed the family tradition of serving in the military as part of the 6th Field Artillery Regiment, based in Lévis, Quebec. Clarke's political involvement began in 2007, when he joined the Conservative Party of Canada.

Clarke spent eight years as an active member of the Conservative Party before being elected as a Member of Parliament. In addition to taking part in various election campaigns and numerous party events, Clarke was president of the Laval University Conservative association from 2013 to 2014 and president of the Beauport–Limoilou Conservative riding association in 2013. Finally, in 2013 he completed an internship with the issues management team in the Office of the Prime Minister of Canada.

Clarke is married and a father of two. He lives in Beauport with his wife, son and daughter.

Political career 
In the 2015 general election, following a long campaign during which he knocked on over 20,000 doors, Clarke was elected the MP for Beauport–Limoilou. Soon after, Rona Ambrose named him Official Opposition critic for veterans affairs (2015–2016) and, later, Official Opposition critic for public services and procurement (2016–2017). Clarke's parliamentary duties included sitting on the Standing Committee on Veterans Affairs (ACVA) and the Standing Committee on Government Operations and Estimates (OGGO).

In 2017, the new Conservative Leader, Andrew Scheer, appointed Clarke Shadow Cabinet Secretary for Official Languages and La Francophonie, and since September 2018, he served as Deputy Shadow Minister for Small Business and Export Promotion, Official Languages and la Francophonie and sat on the Standing Committee on Official Languages as Vice-Chair.

Electoral record

References

External links

1986 births
Living people
Conservative Party of Canada MPs
French Quebecers
Members of the House of Commons of Canada from Quebec
Politicians from Quebec City
Université Laval alumni
21st-century Canadian politicians